The Matra MS640 is a sports prototype race car, designed, developed, and built by the French manufacturer Matra in 1969. Two examples of this car were made: the original one from 1969 and the rebuild from 2005.

Development
Featuring a tubular trellis frame not very different from that of the MS650, the Matra MS640 coupe featured a drop-shaped bodywork designed by Robert Choulet, an aerodynamic engineer with previous experiences at Deutsch & Bonnet who was inspired by to his other creations. It had shapes that made it look like a record car, extremely elongated, with a very small cockpit covered by an equally small bubble roof, rounded wheel arches (which partially covered the wheels at the rear), and stabilizing fins on the tail. The power unit was the 420 Matra MS9 V12 3-liter, built-in 1968 on the initiative of the French government and already mounted on the Matra MS630.

History and background

After the creation of the MS630 for the 1968 season in accordance with the new regulations (prototypes with 3-liter displacement, sports cars with 5-liter displacement, and 50 units), a car that had performed well at the 24 Hours of Le Mans of that year holding the second place for a long time and giving it up towards the end of the race due to two punctures and a fatal short circuit, the director of Matra Jean Luc Lagardère entrusted Robert Choulet with the task of designing a closed car, extremely aerodynamic and designed specifically for the circuit of the Sarthe, in order to compensate for the power gap suffered against the Porsche 917, Ferrari 312P and Alfa Romeo 33/3 and the higher consumption compared to the Porsche 908. The resulting car tickled the imagination and expectations of Lagardère, the press, and all of France, who could finally cultivate the dream of a "voiture bleu" on the top step of the podium at the 24 Hours of Le Mans.

At the collective tests of Le Mans, which were held in March, the new Matra 640 was not yet ready and the French manufacturer only fielded an MS630, recovering in April the work lost on that occasion: it organized a private test session with all the Circuit de la Sarthe for itself, away from prying eyes who could study the new weapon. The car was entrusted to Henri Pescarolo and Johnny Servoz-Gavin, who had to develop the car on a real circuit, as it only had a few kilometers traveled on the runway of Marigny airport on its shoulders, on the occasion of the presentation to the press. Pescarolo was the first to leave, instructed by the sporting director Georges Martin and by designer Choulet to gradually push the car towards the limit. The first laps had to be done in a “neutral” aerodynamic configuration, to then make the further trim and aerodynamic adjustments.

Overcome a bump, the 640 took off like an airplane "flying" along the runway with the wheels off the ground and the engine howling until the nose did not rear up causing it to flip and then crash to the side of the runway. From the pits, a column of smoke was seen and immediately the team rushed to the scene of the accident: the trees had been cut at a height of one and a half meters and the debris was scattered within a radius of a few hundred meters, but the pilot was alive, although he then had to spend six months of very long convalescence to recover from burns, fractures of the limbs and injuries to the spine. Having recovered, although still limping, he won the 1000 km of Paris on the Montlhéry circuit aboard a Matra 650 paired with Beltoise. The "640", on the other hand, will never be used in the race as Jean-Luc Lagardère did not consent to the creation of another model, thus prompting Choulet to leave Matra in October 1969 to join the Porsche.

After the accident, an attempt was made to understand the causes, which in the designer's opinion had to be found in the bending of some parts of the bodywork, specifically the upper part of the doors, under the thrust of the air at high speeds. As the shape of the body changed, it became unstable and ready for take-off, a tendency that led to the accident and that could have been discovered and eliminated if the pilot had gradually reached the maximum performance of the car lap after lap, according to Choulet. The fact is that the car's extreme aerodynamics meant that a minimum of inconvenience was enough to get to the accident.

Second version

In 1989 the original molds were found in the Matra factory, with some parts of the second bodywork inside and in 1995 Norma built a second frame and the missing parts of the bodywork on the basis of the original designs. For nine years the reconstruction of the MS 640 was stalled due to a lack of skilled craftsmen and after extensive research throughout France, it was entrusted to the EPAF in 2004, a company specializing in the restoration of racing cars, which completed the work through the use of construction techniques of 1969.

Once the car is completed, it is decided to subject it to a series of tests, which is also invited to attend the now over sixty Henry Pescarolo, who however asks to be the one who will sit behind the wheel, to complete the work interrupted over thirty-five years earlier. , getting a positive response. To avoid the repetition of the disastrous accident of 1969, this 640 was equipped with a sensor system on the suspension front that warned the driver of the approaching limit beyond which the car would take off. Putting the wheels on the track, every attempt to go beyond the tourist pace set off the alarm, so that the car went in and out of the pits to change the set-up and try again. The last test that remains to be done is to lower the nose until it touches the ground, to obtain maximum downforce, but the risk is that at the first braking it will stick to the asphalt: the front brakes should be deactivated, but the technicians exclude this possibility for safety reasons and communicate the end of the test to the pilot. But Pescarolo is not there and wants to continue testing even without front brakes, despite everyone's opposition.

The machine thus modified no longer gives alarms and reaches almost  without taking off. At the end of the test, Pescarolo returns to the pits smiling, and jumps out of the passenger compartment invaded by acrid smoke coming from the faired rear wheel arches, from which flames come out. Too stressed by the deactivation of the front brakes, the rear brakes overheated triggering a start of fire, tamed by the driver without stopping to smile, satisfied at having finally closed a speech left unresolved.

The Matra MS640 is exhibited at the Espace automobiles Matra museum in Romorantin – Lanthenay, between Bourges and Orléans , in France .

References 

Matra vehicles
Sports prototypes
24 Hours of Le Mans race cars
Le Mans winning cars
Mid-engined cars
1970s cars